Košťany is a town in Teplice District in the Ústí nad Labem Region of the Czech Republic. It has about 3,200 inhabitants.

Administrative parts
The village of Střelná is an administrative part of Košťany.

Geography
The southern part of the municipal territory with the built-up area lies in the Most Basin. The northern part lies in the Ore Mountains and borders Germany.

History
The first written mention of Košťany is from 1394. In 1994 Košťany received the town status.

Twin towns – sister cities

Košťany is twinned with:
 Košťany nad Turcom, Slovakia
 Valaliky, Slovakia

References

External links

Cities and towns in the Czech Republic
Populated places in Teplice District